The 2008 European Ladies' Team Championship took place 8–12 July at Stenungsund Golf Club in Stenungsund, Sweden. It was the 26th women's golf amateur European Ladies' Team Championship.

Venue 
The hosting Stenungsund Golf Club was founded in 1989. The 18-hole course, with the character of a links course with large undulated greens, situated in Spekeröd, Stenungsund Municipality, 2 kilometres from the sea and 35 kilometres north of Gothenburg, Sweden, was designed by Peter Nordwall. The second nine holes opened in 1990.

The championship course was set up with par 72.

Format 
All participating teams played two qualification rounds of stroke-play with six players, counted the five best scores for each team.

The eight best teams formed flight A, in knock-out match-play over the next three days. The teams were seeded based on their positions after the stroke-play. The first placed team was drawn to play the quarter final against the eight placed team, the second against the seventh, the third against the sixth and the fourth against the fifth. In each match between two nation teams, two 18-hole foursome games and five 18-hole single games were played. Teams were allowed to switch players during the team matches, selecting other players in to the afternoon single games after the morning foursome games. Teams knocked out after the quarter finals played one foursome game and four single games in each of their remaining matches. Games all square after 18 holes were declared halved, if the team match was already decided.

The eight teams placed 9–16 in the qualification stroke-play formed flight B, to play similar knock-out match-play, with one foursome game and four single games to decide their final positions.

Teams 
16 nation teams contested the event. Each team consisted of six players.

Players in the teams

Winners 
Team England lead  the opening 36-hole qualifying competition, with a score of 14 under par 706, three strokes ahead of defending champions team Spain.

Individual leader in the 36-hole stroke-play competition was Jodi Ewart, England, with a score of 9 under par 135, four strokes ahead of four players on tied second place.

Host nation Sweden won the championship, beating team Netherlands 5–2 in the final and earned their fifth title. For the first time in the history of the championship, a pair of twins was part of the winning team, as 19-years-old Caroline and Jacqueline Hedwall played for team Sweden. So did also future professional major winners Pernilla Lindberg and Anna Nordqvist.

Team Spain earned third place, beating England 6–1 in the bronze match.

Results 
Qualification round

Team standings

* Note: In the event of a tie the order was determined by the better total non-counting scores.

Individual leaders

 Note: There was no official award for the lowest individual score.

Flight A

Bracket

Final games

* Note: Game declared halved, since team match already decided.

Flight B

Bracket

Final standings

Sources:

See also 
 Espirito Santo Trophy – biennial world amateur team golf championship for women organized by the International Golf Federation.
 European Amateur Team Championship – European amateur team golf championship for men organised by the European Golf Association.

References

External links 
 European Golf Association: Results

European Ladies' Team Championship
Golf tournaments in Sweden
European Ladies' Team Championship
European Ladies' Team Championship
European Ladies' Team Championship